General Motors has produced two different engines called LT4:
 1996–1997 LT4 – GM Generation II Small-Block
 2015-(current) LT4 - GM Generation V Small-Block – Used in the Z06 Corvette & Cadillac CTS-V & Camaro ZL1 for years 2017–2019.